Luiz Edson Fachin (born 8 February 1958) is a Brazilian jurist and lawyer. On June 16, 2015, he became a justice of the Supreme Federal Court. Before that, he was a professor of civil law of the Federal University of Paraná (UFPR).

See also
Operation Car Wash

References

|-

|-

1958 births
Living people
People from Rio Grande do Sul
Federal University of Paraná alumni
Pontifical Catholic University of São Paulo alumni
Supreme Federal Court of Brazil justices
20th-century Brazilian lawyers
21st-century Brazilian judges